Walter Charles Kilrea (February 18, 1909 – July 3, 1992) was a Canadian professional ice hockey left winger who played 9 seasons in the National Hockey League for the Philadelphia Quakers, New York Americans, Ottawa Senators, Montreal Maroons and Detroit Red Wings. With the Red Wings he won the Stanley Cup in 1936 and 1937. He was born in Navan, Ontario. His brothers Hec and Ken also played in the NHL, as did his nephew Brian Kilrea. His son Wally Jr. was an All-American at Yale.

Career statistics

Regular season and playoffs

Awards

NHL

References

External links
 

1909 births
1992 deaths
American Hockey League coaches
Canadian expatriate ice hockey players in the United States
Canadian ice hockey coaches
Canadian ice hockey left wingers
Detroit Olympics (IHL) players
Detroit Red Wings players
Fort Worth Rangers players
Hershey Bears players
Ice hockey people from Ottawa
London Panthers players
Montreal Maroons players
New York Americans players
Ottawa Senators (1917) players
Ottawa Senators (original) players
Philadelphia Quakers (NHL) players
Pittsburgh Hornets players
Stanley Cup champions
Windsor Bulldogs (1929–1936) players